"Life Gets Tee-Jus Don't It" is a country music song/spoken word recital that was written and sung/spoken by Carson Robison (backing by The Pleasant Valley Boys) and released on the M-G-M label (catalog no. 10224-A). In August 1948, it reached No. 3 on the Billboard folk best seller and juke box charts. It was also ranked as the No. 7 record on Billboard's 1948 year-end folk record sellers chart.

References

American country music songs
1948 songs